Gymnopus herinkii is a rare species of mushroom-forming fungus in the family Omphalotaceae. It was described in 1998 by mycologists Vladimír Antonín and Machiel Noordeloos. The type specimen was from a collection made in the Lenora region of Bohemia, made by Czech mycologists Jiří Kubička and Josef Herink in 1952; the latter is acknowledged in the species epithet. Marcel Bon proposed a transfer to the genus Collybia in 1998.

Characteristic features of Gymnopus herinkii include the distantly-spaced gills on the underside of the hygrophanous, brown cap, and an onion-like odour. Microscopic characteristics include the lack of cheilocystidia, and the lack of a dryophila-structure in the pileipellis. The fungus grows on fallen leaves or humus.

See also
List of Gymnopus species

References

Agaricales
Fungi described in 1996
Fungi of Europe
Taxa named by Machiel Noordeloos